The ochre-breasted pipit (Anthus nattereri) is a species of bird in the family Motacillidae.

It is found in Argentina, Brazil, and Paraguay.

Its natural habitats are subtropical or tropical dry lowland grassland. It is threatened by habitat loss.

References

ochre-breasted pipit
Birds of Argentina
Birds of Brazil
Birds of the South Region
Birds of Paraguay
Birds of Uruguay
ochre-breasted pipit
ochre-breasted pipit
Taxonomy articles created by Polbot